Henryk Franciszek Górski (born 4 April 1938) is a Polish former sport shooter who competed in the 1960 Summer Olympics and in the 1964 Summer Olympics.

References

1938 births
Living people
Polish male sport shooters
ISSF rifle shooters
Olympic shooters of Poland
Shooters at the 1960 Summer Olympics
Shooters at the 1964 Summer Olympics
Sportspeople from Gdynia
20th-century Polish people